{{Infobox radio station
| name             = KOTM-FM
| logo             = File:KOTM TOM FM97.7 logo.jpg
| city             = Ottumwa, Iowa
| area             =
| branding         = TOM FM 97.7
| frequency        = 97.7 MHz
| airdate          = 
| format           = Commercial; Top 40 (CHR)
| erp              = 19,000 watts
| haat             = 112 meters
| class            = C3
| facility_id      = 
| coordinates      = 
| callsign_meaning = Ottumwa| former_callsigns = 
| owner            = Ottumwa Radio Group
| licensee         = O-Town Communications, Inc.
| sister_stations  = KLEE, KBIZ, KRKN, KKSI, KTWA
| webcast          = Listen Live!
| website          = 
| affiliations     =  
}}KOTM-FM (97.7 MHz, "97.7 Tom FM") is a radio station broadcasting a Top 40 (CHR) format serving Ottumwa, Iowa. The station is currently owned by Greg List, through licensee O-Town Communications, Inc.

On March 2, 2009, KOTM rebranded from "97.7 KOTM" to "97.7 Tom FM" to prevent confusion of the KOTM call letters, which stand for Otum'''wa.
The new branding was named after Tom Palen, the owner was FMC Broadcasting Inc. at the time of the change.

References

External links
97.7 Tom FM official website

OTM-FM
Ottumwa, Iowa
Contemporary hit radio stations in the United States